The independent voting movement is a group of progressive, anti-party, left/center/right alliance, independent voters in the United States seeking to reform the two-party electoral process at all levels of government. The primary organizing entity for the movement is the Committee for a Unified Independent Party (CUIP), and its Internet presence, independentvoting.org.  Their mission is to "develop a movement of independent voters for progressive post-partisan reform of the American political process".

, 40% of U.S. adults identify as independent.

History 
Although the current independent movement is not a political party, it has its roots in several, the most prominent being the New Alliance Party of New York City, the brainchild of Fred Newman.  The NAP dissolved in 1994, and a number of its members, including Newman and activist Lenora Fulani joined the Independence Party of New York state (IPNY), whilst also, along with Jacqueline Salit, starting the Committee for a Unified Independent Party.  Many of the CUIP founders were also involved, through various organizations, in the formation of the Reform Party in 1995, an outgrowth of Ross Perot's 1992 Presidential campaign.  Members of the CUIP worked with the IPNY to successfully elect Michael Bloomberg mayor of New York City in 2001, 2005, and 2009, though it is unclear the extent of the participation.  It is also unclear if the CUIP has always been anti-party, or if it has evolved this philosophy based on its dealings with the IPNY over the last 15 years.  Today, the independent movement has many leading figures in New York, and New York City, and it has branched across the country to organize grassroots movements under its umbrella.

Current organization 
Jacqueline Salit is the current head of the movement from her position as president of CUIP and independentvoting.org. Nancy Ross is the secretary and treasurer of the organization.

According to the organization's website:

Affiliate groups 
 AL, Independent Alabama
 AZ, Arizona Independents
 CA, IndependentVoice.org
 CT, Independent Party
 DE, Independent Party of Delaware
 FL, Florida Independentvoting.org
 GA, Georgia Independent Voters
 GA, iMove
 IA, Independent Voters of Iowa
 ID, American Independent Movement
 IL, United Independents of Illinois
 KY, Independent Kentucky (independentkentucky.org)
 MA, Massachusetts Coalition of Independent Voters
 MD, Independent Movement of Maryland
 MI, Grand Valley State College Independents
 MS, Committee for Open Primaries
 NC, North Carolina Independents
 NH, New Hampshire Independent Voters
NJ, New Jersey Independent Voters https://www.facebook.com/newjerseyindependentvoters
 NV, Independent Voters of Nevada (IVON)
 NY, New York City Independence Party
 OH, Independent Ohio (independentohio.org)
 PA, Independent Pennsylvanians (paindependents.org)
 SC, Independence Party of South Carolina
 SD, South Dakota Voice of Independents
 TN, Independent Tennessee
 TX, Independent Texans
 UT, Utah League of Independent Voters
 VA, Virginia Independent Voters Association (VIVA)
 WA, Washington Association of Independent Voters (WAIV)
 WI, Wisconsin Group for an Independent Voice (WiGiv)

References

External links 

Elections in the United States
Nonpartisan organizations in the United States
Political movements in the United States